The 2017–18 Furman Paladins women's basketball team represents Furman University during the 2017–18 NCAA Division I women's basketball season. The Paladins, led by eighth-year head coach Jackie Carson, play their home games at Timmons Arena and were members of the Southern Conference. They finished the season 17–13, 7–7 in SoCon play to finish in fourth place. They lost in the quarterfinals of the Southern women's tournament to Samford. They received an invite to the WBI where they defeated UNC Asheville in the first round before losing to South Alabama in the quarterfinals.

Roster

Schedule

|-
!colspan=9 style=| Exhibition

|-
!colspan=9 style=| Regular season

|-
!colspan=9 style=| SoCon Tournament

|-
!colspan=9 style=| WBI

See also
2017–18 Furman Paladins men's basketball team

References

Furman
Furman Paladins women's basketball seasons
Furman